Songs for the Restless is the second album by the Florida-based rock music group Endo. The album was released on July 22, 2003 via DV8/Columbia Records (a division of Sony Music). It was notable for its shift from the rap metal sound of their previous album to a more melodic post-grunge sound, though still maintaining the nu metal style the band known for.

The track "Simple Lies" is present on the soundtrack for the 2003 movie, Daredevil.

Track listing
 "Clean Sheets (And a Dirty Mind)"  – 2:54
 "Simple Lies"  – 4:07
 "For You"  – 3:36
 "Remember Us"  – 3:24
 "In Time We'll Fall"  – 3:15
 "Circles"  – 4:25
 "Madness"  – 3:12
 "Enemy"  – 3:17
 "Shame"  – 3:01
 "I Won't Die"  – 4:31
 "Ruckus"  – 3:31
 "Slowly Turning"  – 4:02
 "Disintegration" (Japanese import track) - 3:14

Personnel
 Gil Bitton – vocals
 Eli Parker – guitar
 Joe Eshkenazi – drums
 Zelick – bass

Production
 Jason Cupp – assistant engineer
 John Halpern – photography
 Aaron Marsh – artwork, design
 Alan Mason – assistant engineer
 Dean Nelson – assistant engineer
 Jon Pikus – A&R
 Keith Sarkisian – booking
 Andrew Scheps – engineer, digital editing
 David Schiffman – producer, engineer, mixing
 Eddy Schreyer – mastering

References

2003 albums
Endo (band) albums
Columbia Records albums
Albums produced by David Schiffman